Andrey Golubev and Evgeny Korolev were the defending champions, but decided not to participate.

Jaroslav Pospíšil and Franko Škugor won the title, defeating Diego Sebastián Schwartzman and Horacio Zeballos in the final 6–4, 6–4.

Seeds

Draw

Draw

References
 Main Draw

Marburg Openandnbsp;- Doubles
2014 Doubles